Enver Altaylı (born 1944, Ceyhan, Adana) is a Turkish academic, writer and former secret agent for the Turkish National Intelligence Organization (MIT).

Education and early life 
He was born into a family of Uzbek refugees in 1944. He was named Enver after Enver Pasha. He entered the Turkish War College from which he was expelled with his fellow students after the failed coup d'état in 1963. The former schools principal Colonel  was identified as one of the coup plotters. He then unsuccessfully pursued a career as a journalist at the nationalist newspaper Yeni Istanbul. Between 1964 and 1965 he supported the youth branch of the Republican Villagers Nation Party (CKMP) of Alparslan Türkes. He then became employed by the Institute for Research on Turkish Culture. From there he was recruited to the MIT by its then president Fuat Doğu. He became close to Ruzi Nazar on who he wrote a book about. He resigned from the MIT in 1974 and joined the Nationalist Movement Party. He travelled abroad, to Germany, Azerbaijan and Uzbekistan and also became an advisor to the Turkish presidents Suleyman Demirel and Turgut Özal.

Legal prosecution 
He was arrested in 2017 and tried together with another MIT officer for having attempted to plan the flight of the latter after his dismissal from public service in the purges in the aftermath of the coup d'état attempt of 2016.

In 2021 he was sentenced to ten years imprisonment for terrorism due to his alleged links to the Gülen Movement which is accused of having been involved in the coup attempt of 2016 plus an additional 13 years for espionage. He has a daughter which is also his lawyer and imprisoned in Sincan prison in Ankara.

References 

1944 births
Army War College (Turkey) alumni
Gülen movement
Living people
People from Ceyhan
People of the National Intelligence Organization (Turkey)
Turkish nationalists
Turkish prisoners and detainees
Turkish people of Uzbekistani descent
Turkish writers